Anthony Richard Conigliaro (January 7, 1945 – February 24, 1990), nicknamed "Tony C" and "Conig", was a Major League Baseball outfielder and right-handed batter who played for the Boston Red Sox (1964–1967, 1969–1970, 1975) and California Angels (1971). Born in Revere, Massachusetts, he was a 1962 graduate of St. Mary's High School in Lynn, Massachusetts. Conigliaro started his MLB career as a teenager, hitting a home run in his first at-bat during his home field debut in 1964. During the Red Sox "Impossible Dream" season of 1967, he was hit in the face by a pitch that caused a severe eye injury and derailed his career. Though he would make a comeback from the injury, his career was not the same afterwards.

Baseball career
Conigliaro was signed by the Red Sox in 1962, at the age of 17. In 1963, he batted .363 with 24 home runs playing for the Wellsville Red Sox in the New York–Penn League, after which he was called up to the majors.

During his 1964 rookie season, Conigliaro batted .290 with 24 home runs and 52 RBI in 111 games, but broke his arm and his toes in August. In his first at-bat in Fenway Park, Conigliaro hit a towering home run in the second inning against the White Sox.

In his sophomore season in 1965, Conigliaro led the league in home runs (32), becoming the youngest home run champion in American League history. He was selected for the All-Star Game in 1967. In that season, at age 22, he not only reached a career total of 100 home runs, but attained that milestone at the youngest age for an American League player.

On August 18, 1967, the Red Sox were playing the California Angels at Fenway Park. Conigliaro, batting against Jack Hamilton, was hit by a pitch on his left cheekbone and was carried off the field on a stretcher. He sustained a linear fracture of the left cheekbone and a dislocated jaw with severe damage to his left retina. The batting helmet he was wearing did not have the protective ear-flap that has since become standard, partly due to this incident.

A year and a half later, Conigliaro made a remarkable return, hitting 20 homers with 82 RBI in 141 games, earning Comeback Player of the Year honors. In 1970, he reached career-high numbers in home runs (36) and RBI (116). That season he and his brother Billy formed two-thirds of the Red Sox outfield. After a stint with the Angels in 1971, he returned to the Red Sox briefly in 1975 as a designated hitter, but was forced to retire because his eyesight had been permanently damaged.

Conigliaro batted .267, with 162 home runs and 501 RBI during his 802-game Red Sox career. With the Angels, he hit .222 with 4 home runs and 15 RBI in 74 games. He is the second-youngest player to hit his 100th homer (after Mel Ott), and the youngest American League player to do so.

Final years and death
After his retirement, in the fall of 1975, Conigliaro opened a restaurant in Providence, Rhode Island, managed by his brother Billy. In September of that same year, he was hired by WJAR TV 10 in Providence as a sports anchor. In August 1976, he moved to a similar position at KGO-TV Channel 7 in San Francisco. 

On January 9, 1982, then 37-year-old Conigliaro was in Boston to interview for a broadcasting position when he suffered a heart attack while being driven to the airport by his brother Billy. Shortly thereafter, he suffered a stroke and lapsed into a coma. Conigliaro never fully recovered and suffered slight brain damage due to the stroke, until his death more than eight years later, in February 1990, at the age of 45 from pneumonia and kidney failure. In commemoration, the Red Sox wore black armbands that season. He is interred at Holy Cross Cemetery in Malden, Massachusetts.

Since 1990, the Tony Conigliaro Award, instituted by the Red Sox after his death, is given annually to the MLB player who best overcomes obstacles and adversities through the attributes of spirit, determination and courage that were considered Tony's trademarks.

Conigliaro's Corner

For the start of the 2007 season, Red Sox ownership added a new 200-seat bleacher section on the right field roof, providing an additional 16,200 available tickets for the season. It was named "Conigliaro's Corner" in honor of Conigliaro. The seats were being marketed specifically towards families. As of May 2007, the section was reserved for Red Sox Nation members on Saturdays and Red Sox Kid Nation members on Sundays. The seats were removed prior to the start of the 2009 season.

However, this little section of seats (since removed as mentioned above) high above right field in foul territory was not the original "Conig's Corner". When Conigliaro was first making his comeback, he complained about not being able to see the ball well coming from the pitcher's hand because of all of the light-colored clothing being worn by fans directly behind the pitcher in dead center field. To address his concerns, these seats were first blocked off and covered in black tarp to provide a better hitter's background, known as a batter's eye. This small triangular area of seats (bleacher sections 34 and 35) directly adjacent to the center field TV camera nest was the original Conig's Corner at Fenway Park. These same seats are still blocked off for day games for the same reason.

Works cited

See also

 Boston Red Sox Hall of Fame
 List of Major League Baseball annual home run leaders

References

External links

Tony Conigliaro at SABR (Baseball BioProject)
Tony Conigliaro 1995 Inductee, Boston Red Sox Hall of Fame
"Little Red Scooter" via YouTube
"Why Don't They Understand" via YouTube

1945 births
1990 deaths
American League All-Stars
American League home run champions
American people of Italian descent
Baseball players from Massachusetts
Boston Red Sox players
Burials in Massachusetts
California Angels players
Florida Instructional League Red Sox players
Major League Baseball outfielders
Pawtucket Red Sox players
People from Revere, Massachusetts
Wellsville Red Sox players